Jacques Tuyisenge (born 22 September 1991) is a Rwandan professional footballer who plays as a forward for APR F.C. and captains the Rwanda national team.

Club career

Police
Tuyisenge joined local club Police at the age of 16. He was a regular starter and in his first season at the club he scored 11 goals.

Gor Mahia
Tuyisenge joined Kenyan Premier League club Gor Mahia on a $4,000 deal from Police in Rwanda. He scored his first goal in the 21st minute against Tusker from an overhead kick.

Petro de Luanda
In August 2019, Tuyisenge signed with Petro de Luanda in the Angolan league, the Girabola.

International career
On 4 June 2016, Tuyisenge scored two goals in a 3–2 home defeat against Mozambique.

International goals
As of match played 10 September 2019. Rwanda score listed first, score column indicates score after each Tuyisenge goal.

References

External links 
 

1991 births
Living people
Rwandan footballers
Rwanda international footballers
Rwandan expatriate footballers
Rwandan expatriate sportspeople in Kenya
Expatriate footballers in Kenya
Atlético Petróleos de Luanda players
Gor Mahia F.C. players
Police F.C. (Rwanda) players
S.C. Kiyovu Sports players
Association football forwards
Girabola players
Rwanda A' international footballers
2011 African Nations Championship players
2016 African Nations Championship players
2020 African Nations Championship players
Rwandan expatriate sportspeople in Angola
Expatriate footballers in Angola